Events from the year 1796 in Russia.

Incumbents
 Emperor – Catherine II (until November 17), Paul I (after November 17)

Events
 Persian Expedition of 1796
 Storming of Derbent - May 10

 Alexander Palace completed
 Gomel Palace completed
 New Russia trading post established in what is modernly Yakutat, Alaska
 Ulyanovsk (then "Simbirsk") granted city status
 Vsevolod, a 74-gun ship of the line, launched

Births
 Nicholas I of Russia, monarch (d. 1855)
 Pavel Petrovich Anosov, mining engineer, governor, and general (d. 1851)
 Alexander Bagration-Imeretinsky, Georgian prince, Russian general
 Nikolai Brashman, mathematician (d. 1866)
 Nikolai Lukash, general and civil servant (d. 1868)
 Sergey Muravyov-Apostol, Decembrist (d. 1826)
 Mikhail Muravyov-Vilensky, civil servant and statesman (d. 1866)
 Nikita Muravyov, Decembrist (d. 1843)
 Yevgeny Obolensky, Decembrist (d. 1865)
 Nikolai Polevoy, editor, writer, historian (d. 1846)
 Nikolai Turczaninow, botanist (d. 1863)

Deaths
 Catherine II, monarch (born 1729)
 Nikolay Arsenyev, general (b. circa 1739)
 Juvenaly of Alaska, Russian Orthodox martyr (b. 1761)
 Ermil Kostrov, poet and translator (b. 1755)
 Andrei Miloradovich, general and governor (b. 1727)
 Pavel Potemkin, soldier, statesman, writer (b. 1743)
 Gavriil Pribylov, navigator
 Pyotr Rumyantsev, general, (born 1725)

References

1796 in Russia
Years of the 18th century in the Russian Empire